Phatuha Bijaypur (Nepali: फतुहा बिजयपुर) is a municipality in Rautahat District, a part of Province No. 2 in Nepal. It was formed in 2016 occupying current 11 sections (wards) from previous 11 former VDCs. It occupies an area of 65.24 km2 with a total population of 36,533.

References 

Populated places in Rautahat District
Nepal municipalities established in 2017